The 2003-04 Serbian Hockey League season was the 13th season of the Serbian Hockey League, the top level of ice hockey in Serbia. Five teams participated in the league, and HK Vojvodina Novi Sad won the championship.

Playoffs

Semifinals
HK Vojvodina Novi Sad 18 Partizan Beograd 1
KHK Crvena Zvezda 6 HC Novi Sad 4

Final
HK Vojvodina Novi Sad 6 KHK Crvena Zvezda 1

3rd place
HC Novi Sad 9 Partizan Beograd 8

External links
Serbian Ice Hockey Association

Serbian Hockey League
Serbian Hockey League seasons
Serb